Nervia michaeli, or Michael's ranger, is a species of butterfly in the family Hesperiidae. It is found in Zambia and Zimbabwe. The habitat consists of damp, grassy hollows in montane grassland.

Adults are on wing year round.

References

Butterflies described in 1982
Hesperiinae